Isotomus comptus is a species of beetle in the family Cerambycidae, the only species in the genus Isotomus.

References

Clytini
Monotypic beetle genera